Bentonsport, a village on the Des Moines River near Keosauqua, in Van Buren County, Iowa, was recognized in 1972 for being very little changed since its historic heyday as a thriving steamboat port in the mid-1800s.  A  historic district covering 16 original blocks in the historic center of the village was then approved for listing on the National Register of Historic Places.  The district also included waterfront property and the village's historic wagon bridge across the river to the village of Vernon.

The village was platted in March, 1836, and was located at the first dam and locks on the Des Moines River authorized by the state in 1839.  Soon it had two grist mills and a saw mill.  It was named "Benton's Port" for Thomas Hart Benton and once had a population of about 1,000.  It declined after the Keokuk, Fort Des Moines and Minnesota Railroad reached Des Moines in 1866.  The river became non-navigable in 1870 and the dam and locks deteriorated, with the dam "failing" in 1879.  The Bentonsport bridge opened in 1883 and is "the oldest wagon bridge of its type remaining on the Des Moines River."

Today the village has 40 residents, many of them artists and bed & breakfast keepers.

Bentonsport is home to the Lawrence Sullivan Ross Memorial. Erected in 2007, it is Iowa's only Confederate memorial.

Its historic district includes:  
Cowles House, 1840s
a blacksmith shop, 1840s
I.O.O.F. Hall, 1840s, the oldest and perhaps first Odd Fellows Hall in Iowa
Mason House Inn, 1846
Sanford House, 1852
Bentonsport Academy, 1851, perhaps Iowa's oldest high school
Presbyterian Church, 1855
Methodist Parsonage, 1855
Methodist Church, 1857
Herman Greef House, 1863
Greef Dry Goods Store, 1865
Bentonsport General Store
historic bridge, 1882–85

The district includes Federal, Gothic Revival, and "Steamboat Gothic" architecture.

In 2010, as a promotional term, the area calls itself "Bentonsport National Historic District".

References

External links

Greef General Store, Bentonsport Historic District

Geography of Van Buren County, Iowa
Historic districts on the National Register of Historic Places in Iowa
Tourist attractions in Van Buren County, Iowa
National Register of Historic Places in Van Buren County, Iowa
Historic districts in Van Buren County, Iowa